Randhir Pralhadrao Savarkar is a member of the 15th Maharashtra Legislative Assembly. He represents the Akola-East Assembly Constituency. He belongs to the Bharatiya Janata Party.

References

Maharashtra MLAs 2014–2019
People from Akola
Marathi politicians
Bharatiya Janata Party politicians from Maharashtra
1973 births
Living people